The 1985 Critérium du Dauphiné Libéré was the 38th edition of the cycle race and was held from 27 May to 3 June 1985. The race started in Annemasse and finished in Avignon. The race was won by Phil Anderson of the Panasonic–Raleigh team.

Teams
Eleven teams, containing a total of 92 riders, participated in the race:

 
 
 
 
 
 
 
 
 
 
 Rank Xerox–Philadelphia

Route

General classification

References

Further reading

1985
1985 in French sport
1985 Super Prestige Pernod International
May 1985 sports events in Europe
June 1985 sports events in Europe